Brandon Schneider (born December 4, 1971) is an American college women's basketball coach at the University of Kansas. Schneider was previously the head coach, from 2010 to 2015, for Stephen F. Austin State University, and from 1998 to 2010 at Emporia State University, an NCAA Division II school located in Emporia, Kansas, where he led the team to the 2010 National Championship.

Coaching career

Emporia State University 

After a successful playing career at Wayland Baptist University, Schneider was hired as an assistant coach at Emporia State University (ESU) in 1995. After three years of being an assistant coach, Schneider was promoted to head coach, where he stayed for 12 years compiling an overall record of 306–72.

After being an assistant coach for three years, Schneider was promoted to head coach after head coach Cindy Stein left for the University of Missouri. In Schneider's 12 years at the helm, he became the winningest coach in Emporia State history with a record of 306–72. While at Emporia State, Schneider won six MIAA regular season titles, three MIAA tournaments, four Regional titles and the school's first-ever Division II National title in any sport. Schneider led the Lady Hornets to 12 NCAA Tournaments, seven MIAA Regular Season Championships, four MIAA Tournament Championships, four NCAA II South Central Regional Championships, and two NCAA II Final Four Appearances.

Stephen F. Austin University 
In April 2010, one month after leading Emporia State to a National Championship, Schneider became head coach at Stephen F. Austin State University. Schneider won his first conference title during the 2013–14 season with a 13–5 record in league play and reached the championship game of the Women's Basketball Invitational.

University of Kansas 
On April 21, 2015, Schneider was introduced as the new head coach at the University of Kansas, following Bonnie Henrickson, who was fired in March, 2015.

The Kansas women's basketball program was in a rebuild for the first several seasons of Schneider's tenure with Kansas. Schneider coached Kansas to its best season in seven years during 2019-20. Kansas opened the season perfect after going 11-0, which led to the Jayhawks receiving votes in the Associated Press poll. That season KU finished with its best record since 2013 at 15-14. In the 2021–22 season, Schneider's Jayhawks again received votes in the AP and Coaches poll after back-to-back upsets of the 13th-ranked Texas Longhorns and 14th-ranked Baylor Bears.

Personal life
Prior to coaching, Schneider was a 1995 honors graduate of Wayland Baptist University. During his time at Wayland Baptist, Schneider was a four-year letterman in men’s basketball and was the school’s first-ever All-American, capturing the honor three times. Schneider's father, Bob, was one of the most successful women's coaches at the NCAA Division II level, having served as the head coach at West Texas A&M from 1981 to 2006. They became the first father/son combination to take teams to the Elite Eight. Schneider and his wife Ali have two sons.

Head coach record

References

External links
 Kansas Jayhawks bio

1971 births
Living people
American men's basketball players
American women's basketball coaches
Basketball coaches from Texas
Basketball players from Texas
Emporia State Lady Hornets basketball coaches
Kansas Jayhawks women's basketball coaches
People from Canyon, Texas
Stephen F. Austin Ladyjacks basketball coaches
Wayland Baptist Pioneers men's basketball players